Mia Pankau (1891–1974) was a German film actress. She was married to the director Jaap Speyer, who directed her in a number of films during the silent era.

Selected filmography
 Hedda's Revenge (1919)
 Lilli (1919)
 Lilli's Marriage (1919)
 The Red Night (1921)
 King of Women (1923)
 Jimmy: The Tale of a Girl and Her Bear (1923)
 The Almighty Dollar (1923)
 The Elegant Bunch (1925)
 Letters Which Never Reached Him (1925)
 The Morals of the Alley (1925)
 White Slave Traffic (1926)
 Hotel Rats (1927)
 The Three Women of Urban Hell (1928)
 The First Kiss (1928)
 The Last Testament (1929)

References

Bibliography
 Grange, William. Cultural Chronicle of the Weimar Republic. Scarecrow Press, 2008.

External links

1891 births
1974 deaths
German film actresses
German silent film actresses
20th-century German actresses